Rubix is a British multinational company based in London specialised in the distribution of industrial products and services for industrial engineering, maintenance (technical) and operations. Rubix has become the number 1 company in Europe in the maintenance, repair and overhaul (MRO) sector with 750 locations across 22 countries and a turnover of 2.6 billion euros in 2021.

The company serves over 220,000 customers and distributes over 2 million products, including bearings, mechanical power transmission components, flow technology and fluid power products, machining, cutting tool materials, personal protective equipment and general maintenance products, as well as logistics and technical services.

Rubix has five exclusive brands: Cutline (high-performance rotary cutting tools), GISS (PPE and safety products), Mecaline (mechanical power transmission products), Roebuck (hand tools), and Spartex (industrial essentials).

History 

Rubix was created on 26 June 2018, following the name change of the IPH-Brammer Group. It was created in September 2017 following the merger of the Brammer group and the IPH group, both acquired by US investment fund Advent International in 2017.

Rubix has been ranked Number 28 on the 2020 Sunday Times HSBC Top Track 100. In August 2022, Rubix achieved a Gold EcoVadis sustainability rating, placing them in the top 2% of companies in their industry.  In 2021, Rubix reduced Scope 1 emissions by 26%, Scope 2 emissions by 8%, and Scope 3 emissions by 25%.

Corporate affairs

Executive management
In February 2023, the executive board members are:
 Martin Thomsen, Chief Executive Officer
 Andrew Silverbeck, Chief Financial Officer
 Gatien Gillon, Chief Operating Officer
 Helen Ebert, Group General Counsel
 David Morkeberg, Group HR Director
 Lee Pruitt, Chief Digital & Marketing Officer
 Jesper Mikkelsen, Group VP – Services
 Pierre Allard-Couluon, Group Chief Sales Officer

while country general managers are:
 Tiziano Biasoli, Italy
 Jesus Martinez Planas, Spain
 Franck Voisin, France
 Paul van der Rest, Benelux and Nordics
 Vince McGurk, UK
 Pinaki Banerjee, Central and Eastern Europe
 André Thönes, DACH

Countries and Subsidiaries
Rubix provides industrial products and services in 22 countries: Austria, Belgium, Czech Republic, Denmark, Finland, France, Germany, Hungary, Iceland, Ireland, Italy, Luxembourg, Netherlands, Norway, Portugal, Poland, Romania, Slovakia, Spain, Sweden, Switzerland and the United Kingdom.
 Advanced Industrial Rewinds (AIR) (United Kingdom)
 AKN (Germany)
 Barlotti (Italy)
 Bedu (Netherlands)
 Brammer (multiple locations)
 BT Brammer (Netherlands)
 Brammer Buck & Hickman (United Kingdom)
 Buenaventura Giner (Spain)
 Cañellas Protecció S.L.U. (Spain)
 Casa das Correias (Portugal)
 CompCare (United Kingdom)
 C.Plüss (Switzerland)
 Deritend (United Kingdom)
 DHSF (Spain)
 EFC (Netherlands)
 Escudier (France)
 Fluidmec (Italy)
 FIPA (France)
 GeeveHydraulics (Netherlands)
 Gondrom (Germany)
 Hafner (Poland)
 Holding Europeo de Compresores (Spain) 
 Hydraflow Hydraulics (United Kingdom)
 Julsa (Spain)
 Kistenpfennig (multiple locations)
 Knowlton & Newman (United Kingdom)
 LERBS Group (Germany)
 Rubix Spa (Minetti) (Italy)
 Magema (Netherlands)
 Martin Depner (Germany)
 Matara (United Kingdom)
 Matrix (United Kingdom)
 MCA (Netherlands)
 Montalpina (Switzerland)
 Motronic Service Sabadell (Spain)
 Nova Modet (Italy)
 Novo Tech (Romania)
 NT Transmissions (France)
 Orexad Brammer ([rance)
 Outilacier (France)
 Peter Campbell Sales (PCS) (United Kingdom)
 PePe (Poland)
 Petean (Italy)
 RCDE France (Master Outillage) (France)
 Robod (Poland)
 Rubix Benelux (Benelux) 
 Rubix Iceland (Iceland)
 Schäfer Technik (Germany)
 SEALL (Czech Republic)
 Sistemas De Manipulación Asistida (SMA) (Spain)
 Solyro (France)
 Stop Fluid (Spain)
 Suministros Navarro (multiple locations)
 Syresa (Spain)
 TCB (Netherlands)
 Technidis (France)
 TEST SEALING SYSTEMS (Poland)
 Uniseals (Italy)
 Zitec (Germany)

References

External links 

Companies based in London
Engineering companies of the United Kingdom
British companies established in 2018
2018 establishments in England